The Gaza Jar is a storage vessel, which was common from the Roman period to the end of the Byzantine period and the beginning of the early Muslim period in the Holy Land. The origin of its name comes from Gaza City. The jar is made of pottery and is created by using Potter's wheels.

Typical jars

There is a typological division of the jars. During the existence of the Gaza jar – from the 1st century to the 7th century, were identified by Archaeologists four main forms (according to the typology of G. Majcherek).

All types are “Gaza Jars” but there are differences in the shape of the vessel’s rim, body shape, base and volume. All types have two handles. They are not manufactured in the same houses of manufacture, differences in the shape of the jar can be discerned along the timeline.

Type 1: Common from the 1st to the 3rd century. Contains about 30 liters and has a rounded body.

Type 2: Common from the beginning of the 4th century to the middle of the 5th century. Has a cylindrical body (some researchers attribute this type to the “Ashkelon Jar”).

Type 3: Common from the 5th to the 6th century. Has a narrow body with a rounded base.

Type 4: Common in the 7th century. Has a narrow "conical" body with a narrow and pointed base.

Types 3 and 4, are the most common in pottery assemblages from archeological sites in the Byzantine period. Their narrow and conical shape indicates its use as a marine transport jar. The boats and ships had special facilities for jars, the pointed bases of which were stuck in them to prevent displacement and breakage during the voyage.

Use

Primary use
Gaza wine or Ashkelon wine – The main use of the jars was probably wine produced in the southern lowlands, the southern coastal plain and the northern Negev. In the past, people tended to think that the wine came from the Gaza or Ashkelon area only because of the mention of the names Gaza and Ashkelon in ancient sources of travelers and pilgrims from the Byzantine Empire, along with the discovery of Gaza jars from the Galilee in Ashkelon excavations. In the 20th century, it can be concluded that wine production came from a wider area in the Land of Israel.

In the 5th century, the Gaza Jar became the main jar in the Mediterranean trade. It is common in many sites in the Mediterranean basin that were under Byzantine rule. The presence of the jars at coastal sites on the shelves of continents, Europe and Africa indicates the nature of their transport, in maritime trade by boats.

Archaeological evidence for the importance of the wine industry in the south of the country can be seen in the number of wineries and oil presses excavated in the southern coastal plain area. In the Byzantine period, there was high-intensity human activity in Negev. The location of the city of Gaza on the southern coastal plain and its connection with many trade routes contributed to its importance in the economy of the Mediterranean Basin. During the middle of the 4th century, jars full of wine from Gaza and Ashkelon arrived in Egypt. The "Gaza Jars" wine brand seems to have been a favorite of Egyptian residents during this period, given the fact that it was a local wine producer in Egypt from ancient times.

Olive oil – Excavations at the archeological site located in Ashkelon, excavated by The archaeologists Yigal Israel and Tali Erickson Gini and dating to the Roman-Byzantine periods, uncovered kilns of a Gaza Jar next to winepresses to make wine and oil mills. The excavators of the site claim that the jars were used for the storage and export of the oil and wine they produced at the site.

Residues of resin – Chemical tests conducted by the Archaeologists on the basis of the jars, revealed that some of them contained black organic matter, which originated in coniferous resin. Only jars that were used to store wine appear to have been coated with resin, in primary use.

Secondary use
The jar appears to have been a by-product of local production on the southern coastal plain. Once the contents were purchased (probable wine) the jar was used for storage, heating, transport and even as a habitat for animals.

There is evidence that fish bones were found inside the conical-type Gaza Jars, apparently, there was a fish axis or canned fish inside.

There are cases of secondary use of animal-raising jars, such as pigeon nests or as a tool intended for spawning fish. The jar was also used to store olive oil, sesame oil, wheat, pistachios, beans, sweets and cheese. This information is based on research conducted by the researcher Philip Mayerson in ancient sources such as papyrus from the Byzantine period in which the jars of Gaza or Ashkelon are mentioned for their contents.

Fireplace or Tabun oven – Between 1993 and 1994, excavations were carried out by Tali Erickson Gini on behalf of the Israel Antiquities Authority in the Nabataean city of Mamshit in the Negev. The ceramic complex of the site contained pottery for cooking and storage as well as Gaza Jars. But beyond the presence of the jars in the daily ceramic complex, heating devices that were made from bases of type 2 Gaza jars were excavated. In one of the rooms, about two bases of Gaza Jars with soot on them were found on site. The structure ceased to exist after the earthquake that occurred on 19 May 363, and generally operated, as wrote Dr. Tali Erickson-Gini: "from the end of the 3rd century".

Distribution

In Israel

Over the years, a number of archeological excavations have been conducted in the southern coastal plain of Israel, such as the excavation in Ashkelon and other excavations. In many of the sites, kilns were discovered to create the pottery, a figure that proves the existence of the jars Workshop. The proliferation of houses in the vicinity of agricultural facilities for wine production proves that the phenomenon of pottery production relied on the production of partial production and was in fact created as a "by-product" industry – first the wine was created and as a result, the jar was created.

Yigal Israel's research from the early 1990s illuminated the map of the distribution sites of Gaza Jars. A survey was conducted in Israel by the Israel Antiquities Authority. The survey surveyed about 20 settlement sites from the Byzantine period. At some sites, kilns were seen on the surface and stones. All the sites are located near streams or wadis near the raw material used to build the tools – clay. However, the southern coastal plain and northern Negev region are not the absolute boundaries of the houses of the creator. In light of several studies, houses of art were discovered in the vicinity of the city of Yavne.

A large number of pottery fragments from Gaza jars from the 5th and 6th centuries were found in an organized archeological excavation near the Karni crossing.

In the world

Gaza Jars are found in many assemblies at sites in the Mediterranean basin including more western countries such as France, Spain, Italy, England and Germany. Types are known from Istanbul, Turkey, Berenice (Cyrenaica) (an ancient city in the Cyrenaica region from the Roman-Byzantine periods near Benghazi, Libya), Carthage, Tunisia and Alexandria in Egypt.

Further reading
  Majcherek, Grzegorz, Gazan amphorae: Typology reconsidered, Hellenistic and Roman Pottery in the Eastern Mediterranean: Advances in Scientific Studies, Acts of the Second Workshop at Nieborow, 1995, pp. 166–178.
 .שרית עוקד, "קנקני עזה – היבטים כרונולוגים וכלכליים", בתוך אשקלון – עיר לחוף ימים, הוצאת אוניברסיטת תל אביב, 2001, עמ' 228–235
 .אלי ינאי, "מכלול כבשנים לצריפת כלי חרס מהתקופה הביזנטית ביבנה", קדמוניות, 144, 2012, עמ' 94–103

External links 
 Philip Mayerson, The Gaza 'Wine' Jar (Gazition) and the 'Lost' Ashkelon Jar (Askalônion), Israel Exploration Journal, Vol. 42, No. 1/2 (1992), pp. 76–80, on JSTOR
 Daniel Weiss, Dessert Wine, Archaeology, November/December 2020
 שרידים המשקפים את כלכלת חקלאי חבל עזה-אשקלון בחפירות הרשות – סובב עזה (2 מרץ 2006), רשות העתיקות
 איזור תעשייה ובילויים עתיק, ענק ומסקרן נחשף בגדרה, 14/08/2018, רשות מקרקעי ישראל

Gaza City
Israel in the Roman era
Holy Land during Byzantine rule
Containers